Tony Zhang Zhidong (born 1972), is a Chinese businessman who is the co-founder, former CTO and second-largest individual shareholder of Tencent, a Chinese internet conglomerate.

Early life and education
Zhang Zhidong was born in 1971. He was in the same class at Shenzhen University as Tencent's founder, fellow billionaire Ma Huateng. He also has a master's degree from South China University of Technology.

Career
According to Forbes, Zhang Zhidong has a net worth of $24.1 billion, as of March 2021.

Zhang was Tencent's Chief Technology Officer for 16 years until his retirement in September 2014.

Personal life
He lives in Shenzhen.

References 

1971 births
Living people
Businesspeople from Guangdong
Billionaires from Guangdong
Shenzhen University alumni
South China University of Technology alumni
People from Dongguan
Tencent people
21st-century Chinese businesspeople
Chinese technology company founders